Princess of Rome is an Iranian computer-animated movie about the life of a Christian princess, Malika, mother-to-be of Muhammad al-Mahdi, the 12th Shia Imam, and granddaughter of Caesar of Rome. The animation is 75 minutes in duration and narrates the story of Malika's journey to Samarra in Iraq to marry Hasan al-Askari, the 11th Shia Imam. She changes her name to Nargis Khatoon following the marriage.

The animation was screened at the 33rd Fajr International Film Festival for the first time. The animation was also dubbed in Arabic and released in Iraq, Kuwait, Lebanon and some other Middle Eastern countries.

Princess of Rome features as many as 40 characters in the animation, and almost 100 specialists contributed to its production. Hadi Muhammadian directed the movie and wrote the story. Hamed Jafari was the producer. Hadi Muhammadian has said: "The quality of Roman Princess is far ahead of other animations in Iran and is comparable with foreign works. This was produced with a budget of 600,000 dollars in 15 months, which is a record in the local animation industry". The film producer Jafari said that "the students are the main audience of the film". For this reason, religious and historical experts thought the animation to be displayed for children and teenagers.

Cast

Persian language
 Nasser Tahmasb
 Manoochehr Valizade
 Hosein Erfani
 Maryam Shirazad
 Arshak GHakosian
 Javad Pezashkian
 Alireza Dibaj
 Maryam Radpor
 Mohamad Ali Dibaj
 Nasim Rezakhani
 Maryam Banaiee
 Sharad Banki
 Alireza Ashkbos
 Mohamad Ali Janpanah

Arabic language
 Sohair Nasreddeen
 Ali Shokair
 Noureddeen Mirzadah
 Omar Mikati
 Ali Saad
 Bilal Bishtawi
 Saad Hamdan
 Rawda Kassem
 Sawssan Awwad
 Joumana Zonji
 Khaled El Sayed
 Omar Al-Shammaa
 Samir Kammoun
 Nisreen Masoud
 Rania Mroueh
 Hussni Badereddeen
 Asmahan Bitar
 Rana Al Rifai

See also
 List of Islamic films
 List of animated Islamic films
 Muhammad al-Mahdi
 Muhammad: The Last Prophet

References

External links
 
 
 Promotional trailer of Princess of Rome

2015 animated films
2015 films
2015 3D films
2015 computer-animated films
Iranian multilingual films
Islamic animated films
2015 multilingual films
Lebanese multilingual films
Iranian animated films
Lebanese animated films
Mahdism